The Moqua Well is a small underground lake, in Nauru.

History
During World War II, Moqua Well was the primary source of drinking water for inhabitants of Nauru. It is for this reason that the body of water is referred to as a well instead of a lake.

In 2001, Nauruan authorities decided to put up a fence to prevent accidents, after an alcohol-related drowning in the same year.

Location

The well is located below the Yaren district. The Moqua Well is not well known, one of a few attractions in Nauru.

Linguistic disambiguation

The name of the well 'Moqua' (sometimes referred to as 'Makwa') is derived from the former name by which Yaren was known.

Other feature

Nearby are the Moqua Caves, a series of caves below Yaren.

References

See also
 Yaren District#Main sights
 Nauru
 Hydrography

Lakes of Nauru
Yaren District
Underground lakes
Tourist attractions in Nauru